Niall Rigney (born 1969 in Portlaoise, County Laois) is an Irish retired hurling manager and player. He played hurling with his local club Portlaoise and was a member of the Laois senior inter-county team from 1988 until 2001. Rigney was the manager of the Laois senior hurling team from 2008 until 2010.

His brother Brian Rigney played rugby for Leinster and Ireland and another brother Colm who played rugby for Connacht

References

 

1969 births
Living people
Portlaoise hurlers
Laois inter-county hurlers
Hurling managers